Yehoshua Blau, also spelled Joshua (22 September 1919 – 20 October 2020) was an Israeli scholar of Arabic language and literature, previously Professor Emeritus at the Hebrew University of Jerusalem.

Life and career
Blau was born in Cluj, Romania in September 1919. He moved to Mandatory Palestine with his family in 1938. He earned a master's degree in Hebrew, Arabic, and Biblical studies in 1942. He married Shulamit in 1945, and they had a son and daughter. His doctoral studies were interrupted by the 1948 Arab-Israeli War, during which he served in the Israel Defense Forces in an intelligence unit. He was awarded a PhD in 1950 for his dissertation, "The Grammar of Judeo-Arabic." Prior to his academic career, he taught at high schools and published several Hebrew grammars. He briefly taught at Tel Aviv University before taking an academic position at the Hebrew University of Jerusalem, where he taught from 1957 to 1986. Even after his retirement, he remained a professor emeritus and informally guided graduate students into his late 90s. He was an active member of the Academy of the Hebrew Language since the 1950s and served as its president from 1981 to 1993. He continued to edit its journal until 1999.

Blau was elected a Corresponding Fellow of the British Academy in 1983.  He published a number of books and articles on the Arabic and Hebrew languages, and the Semitic languages generally, in Hebrew and English (and occasionally in German). Blau was elected as a member of the Israel Academy of Sciences and Humanities in 1968.

Selected works
A grammar of Biblical Hebrew (Porta linguarum Orientalium: Neue Serie 12).  Wiesbaden: O. Harrassowitz. (1976)
On Pseudo-Corrections in Some Semitic Languages.  Jerusalem: The Israel Academy of Sciences and Humanities. (1970)
Phonology and Morphology of Biblical Hebrew (LSAWS 2). Winona Lake: Eisenbrauns. (2010)

See also
 Jewish languages
 Judeo-Arabic languages

References

External links
Joshua (Yehoshua) Blau home page, Hebrew University of Jerusalem
 Ofra Tirosh-Becker, In Memoriam, Professor Joshua Blau z”l (1919–2020)

1919 births
2020 deaths
Corresponding Fellows of the British Academy
Historical linguists
Israeli centenarians
Men centenarians
Linguists from Israel
Israeli Arabists
Writers from Cluj-Napoca
Romanian emigrants to Mandatory Palestine
Israeli people of Romanian-Jewish descent
20th-century linguists
21st-century linguists
Members of the Israel Academy of Sciences and Humanities
Academic staff of Tel Aviv University
Academic staff of the Hebrew University of Jerusalem
Grammarians of Hebrew
Semiticists
Place of death missing